Sandy Point is a historic plantation house located near Edenton, Chowan County, North Carolina. It was built about 1810 and later expanded.  It is a 2 1/2-story, five bay, Federal / Greek Revival style frame dwelling with a center hall plan.  The front facade features a two-tiered full-length porch and the house has two exterior end chimneys at each side.

It was listed on the National Register of Historic Places in 1985.

References

External links

Historic American Buildings Survey in North Carolina
Plantation houses in North Carolina
Houses on the National Register of Historic Places in North Carolina
Federal architecture in North Carolina
Greek Revival houses in North Carolina
Houses completed in 1810
Houses in Chowan County, North Carolina
National Register of Historic Places in Chowan County, North Carolina